Kim Jae-joong (born January 26, 1986), also known mononymously as Jaejoong in South Korea and  in Japan, is a South Korean singer, songwriter, actor and director. He is a member of the Korean pop group JYJ and was one of the original members of boy band TVXQ, where he was formerly known by the stage name Hero Jae-joong. Since 2013, he has expanded his range of activities as a solo artist.

Born in Gongju, Chungcheongnam-do, he moved to Seoul as a teenager to audition for SM Entertainment. From 2003 to 2010, he was the lead vocalist of South Korean boy band TVXQ. Later, he sued SM Entertainment along with Park Yoo-chun and Kim Jun-su and together they separated from TVXQ to form JYJ. As a solo artist, he has released three Korean studio albums, WWW (2013), No.X (2016), and Born Gene (2022). The first two reached number one on the Gaon Music Chart. In Japan, his three studio albums Flawless Love (2019), Love Covers (2019), and Love Covers II (2020) all peaked at number one on the Oricon Albums Chart. He has a fourth Japanese album, Fallinbow, releasing in November 2022. He has toured extensively in South Korea and Japan.

Kim has acted in TV dramas including Sunao ni Narenakute (2010), Protect the Boss (2011), Dr. Jin (2012), Triangle (2014), SPY (2015), Manhole (2017) and Bad Memory Eraser (2022); and in films such as Heaven's Postman (2009) and Jackal is Coming (2012). He has branched into hosting with season 1 and 2 of Lifetime Korea's Travel Buddies (2020, 2021), BS SKY PerfecTV's ジェジュンＪ! (Jaejoong J!, 2021) and has a documentary about his life and career called Jaejoong: On the Road (2021), directed by John H. Lee.

Early life
Kim was born Han Jae-joon (한재준; 韩在俊) in Gongju, Chungcheongnam-do, South Korea. His real birthday, as revealed by his biological mother, was on February 2, instead of January 26. At a young age, he was given up for adoption by his biological mother to the Kim family, and his name was changed to Kim Jae-joong. On November 21, 2006, a man with the surname Han filed a lawsuit against Kim's guardians. Han claimed he was Kim's biological father, and thus wanted parental rights. Han cited the reason for the lawsuit against Kim's legal guardians as "for not going through the proper procedures before registering [Jaejoong] in [the legal guardians'] custody." The first hearing was to be held in Kim's hometown, Gongju, on November 29, 2006, but on November 22 Han dropped the charges against Kim's legal guardians. In reaction to the matter, Kim uploaded a journal entry on his official fan club website, and said that he was informed of the existence of separate biological parents by his mother two or three years ago, and it had been quite a shock to him. With his current mother's support, his biological mother has been able to keep in touch with him, and to meet occasionally, but whereabouts of his father had been unknown. He expressed his will to live by the name of Kim Jae-joong, not by his birth name Han Jae-jun (한재준).

When Kim was fifteen, he moved to Seoul by himself in order to take part in the auditions held by SM Entertainment. Life in Seoul was financially difficult and he took various odd jobs to pay for rent, food, and training fees; and even appeared as an extra in movies. In an interview, he admitted he used to be tone-deaf in primary school and was frequently ridiculed for his dream of becoming a singer, but managed to overcome it through practicing alone.

Kim attended Gongju Jungdong Elementary School (중동초등학교), Kongju National University Middle School (공주대학교 사범대학 부설중학교), Kongju Information High School (공주정보고등학교) and then dropped out in 2001. He enrolled Hanam High School (하남고등학교) in 2005 and Kyung Hee Cyber University (경희사이버대학교), majoring in Digital Media Engineering.

Music career

2003–2010: Member of TVXQ

In 2001, at fifteen years old, Kim auditioned for S.M. Entertainment and was accepted into the agency. From 2003 to 2010, he was the lead vocalist of South Korean boy band TVXQ. After TVXQ went on hiatus in early 2010, he and two other fellow band members Yoochun and Junsu formed a new trio boy group, initially known as JUNSU/JEJUNG/YUCHUN in Japan.

Kim sang the solo track "Maze" for the fifth and final single of the TVXQ/Tohoshinki's Trick Project, "Keyword/Maze".  Jaejoong wrote and composed  which was included on TVXQ/Tohoshinki's twenty-fifth single "Bolero/Kiss the Baby Sky/Wasurenaide."  The song was also on their fourth Japanese album The Secret Code, along with the songs "9095" and "9096" which were also composed by Kim. The song, "忘れないで" was used in a television advertisement for cosmetics in Japan.

Apart from his activities as a member of TVXQ, he sang "Insa" (인사, Greeting) for the soundtrack of A Millionaire's First Love (2006). Kim collaborated with The Grace for the Japanese version of their song "Just for One Day", which was featured on their fifth Japanese single and their debut album, Graceful 4 (2007). Kim sang "Love" for the soundtrack of the film Heaven's Postman (2009) in which he starred as the male lead.

2009–2012: Formation of JYJ 

In 2009 Kim, Junsu and Yoochun, started a lawsuit against their agency, SM Entertainment, and separated from TVXQ, soon founding their own band, JYJ. On September 30, 2009, Kim and bandmate Yoochun released a self-composed single "Colors (Melody and Harmony)/Shelter." The A-side track, Colors (Melody and Harmony), was used as the image song for Hello Kitty's thirty-fifth anniversary. Jaejoong and Yoochun also participated in m-flo's album m-flo TRIBUTE -maison de m-flo, singing the track "Been So Long".

Their debut Japanese language EP The... was released in September 2010, and their first concert DVD from  Tokyo Dome Thanksgiving Live in Dome both reached No. 1 on the Japanese Oricon album and DVD charts. The group's English language debut album, The Beginning was released in October 2010, featuring Kanye West.

In January 2011, they released a Korean EP, Their Rooms "Our Story", with three of Kim's own compositions, "Pierrot" (삐에로), "Nine" and "I.D.S.". In April he toured Asia and North America with JYJ, and later South America and Europe. He was also stage director of the Asian leg of the tour. In September the band released a studio album called In Heaven, which sold 350,000 copies and ranked first on the Gaon charts. He composed two new songs for the album, "In Heaven" and "Get Out". Kim composed "In Heaven" in memory of his good friend, Park Yong-ha, who committed suicide.

Apart from his activities as a member of JYJ, he also sang "Found You" and "For you It's Separation, For me It's Waiting" for the soundtrack of the television drama Sungkyunkwan Scandal (2010), "I'll Protect You" for Protect the Boss (2011), and "Living Like A Dream" for Dr. Jin (2012). "Living Like a Dream" was awarded the Best Hallyu Drama OST at the Seoul International Drama Awards.

2013–2017: Solo Korean albums

On January 17, 2013, Kim released his first solo Korean EP titled I/MINE, a rock-themed album which Kim penned all the lyrics. The album debuted at the top of both the Hanteo and Gaon weekly charts in Korea. It was also met  with resounding success throughout Asia, topping Taiwan's Five Music's Korean and Japanese music chart, Japan's Shinseido weekly chart and Yin Yue Tai's V chart for K-pop. It also topped the  iTunes rock charts in nine countries. Additionally, the pre-released single "One Kiss" and lead single "Mine" topped both domestic charts and foreign charts, including a German Asian music chart. On January 26 and 27, Kim held two days of special concerts at the KINTEX Ilsan to celebrate the launch of the album, as well as his birthday. Kim then released a repackaged version of his album, titled Y which consists of contains two additional tracks: “Only Love” and “Kiss B” . The album was met with success and sold 50,000 copies upon release.

His first full-length Korean solo album, WWW was released on October 29, 2013. A single titled "Sunny Day" was released ahead of the album and topped the iTunes EP chart in Japan. A repackaged version of the album, WWW: Remove Makeup was subsequently released in January 2014 and included the title track "Heaven", a pop ballad with label-mate Gummy. To promote his first album, Kim embarked on his first Asia tour which traveled to regional countries like Japan, Taiwan and China.

He sang "싫어도 (But I)" and "우연 (Coincidence)" for the drama Triangle (2014) in which he also starred. In July 2014, as a member of JYJ, they would release their first studio album in three years, Just Us. The band reached the music charts with the song, "Back Seat".

Prior to his military enlistment in 2015, Kim recorded the songs for his second Korean solo album, No.X, which was released on February 12, 2016. It topped iTunes charts of 39 countries around the world upon its release, and was named the most popular K-pop album in China for 2016. He completed his military service in December 2016 and returned to the entertainment industry with his acting performance in Manhole (2017).

2018–present: Solo albums

Kim released his first Japanese single "Sign / Your Love" on June 27, 2018. On October 24, 2018, he released his second Japanese single, "Defiance" / "Lavender". Both singles would be certified gold (selling over 100,000 copies) by the Recording Industry Association of Japan. Those two songs would be featured on his first Japanese album, Flawless Love which was released on April 10, 2019. The album would be the first time he topped the Oricon Weekly Album Rankings as a solo artist with its debut. He promoted the album in Japan during his tour entitled The Jaejoong Arena Tour 2019 – Flawless Love. His second Japanese album, Love Covers, was released on September 25, 2019, and debuted at number one on the Oricon Weekly Album Rankings. The album was awarded the Planning Award at the 61st Japan Record Awards and the "Best 3 Albums (Asia)" award at the 34th Japan Gold Disc Award.

On January 14, 2020, Kim released his first Korean album in four years with the EP Love song (애요), along with its lead single "Tender Love". Following the EP's release, the cities and dates for his Asia Tour 2020 was announced. However, the tour dates were postponed due to COVID-19 concerns.

He released his third Japanese single on March 10, 2020, "Brava!! Brava!! Brava!!" which debuted at number one on the Oricon weekly chart. It was the opening theme song for Smile Down the Runway. His third Japanese album, Love Covers II was released on July 29, 2020, and debuted at number one on the Oricon weekly chart. It was announced on August 30, 2020, that he would be singing the opening theme song for Noblesse, entitled "BREAKING DAWN" which was written and produced by Hyde. The song will have an English, Korean and Japanese version. His Japanese tour, J-JUN LIVE TOUR 2020～BREAKING DAWN～, originally planned for October 2020 was postponed until Spring of 2021 due to the COVID-19 pandemic in Japan. On September 18, 2020, Kim released "Even If I Call You" for the Mr. Heart (2020) web drama, marking his first Korean soundtrack performance in six years. He soon followed that Korean soundtrack performance with another as he released "Things We Should Love" for the soundtrack of the Korean drama Private Lives on October 28, 2020.

In April 2022, Kim resumed activities in Japan with a live concert for his Japanese fanclub. He released a duet theme song with Kim Junsu, "六等星"  for the television adaptation of the manga Waru - Who said it's not cool to work? on April 13, 2022.

On September 13, 2022, Kim released his first Korean full-length album in six years titled Born Gene. His Asian Tour to promote the album includes stops in Seoul, Kuala Lumpur and Bangkok. He is also releasing a Japanese album, Fallinbow on November 9, 2022 which will then be followed up with a Japanese tour.On October 30, C-JeS Entertainment It was announced that Kim has urgently decided to cancel the Japan concert due to the aftermath of the Itaewon Halloween crowd crush.

Acting career

Prior to his debut as a singer, Kim worked as an extra, playing a soldier in film Taegeukgi. Along with the other members of TVXQ, he acted in television programmes, Banjun Theater and Vacation.

In November 2009, Kim co-starred with Han Hyo-joo in the joint Korean-Japanese telecinema Heaven's Postman as a young man who delivers letters written by the living to the dead and helps lingering ghosts settle their earthly affairs. This was followed by a leading role in Fuji TV's Japanese television drama Sunao ni Narenakute in September 2010. In August 2011, he starred in his first South Korean television series, Protect the Boss with Choi Kang-hee and Ji Sung. He played the role of seemingly a perfect director known for his business acumen, who becomes frustrated and fight against the constraints in his life.

In May 2012, he starred in historical fusion drama Dr. Jin with Song Seung-heon. He played the role of a high-ranking officer of the police force of Joseon Dynasty, who is an illegitimate son of the Joseon era's Prime Minister and his concubine. This was his first time acting in a sageuk, and he was praised for his performance. The same year, Kim made his big screen debut in the action comedy film Jackal is Coming playing a Hallyu star who is kidnapped by an assassin (played by labelmate Song Ji-hyo). His comical acting in the film drew positive reception from fans.

In May 2014, Kim starred in MBC's drama Triangle as a man who grows up to become a lowlife gangster. His performance won the “Top Excellence Award, Actor” at the 7th Korea Drama Awards in October the same year. In January 2015, Kim starred in KBS2's thriller SPY as a genius analyst working for South Korea's National Intelligence Service. The drama is based on the Israeli drama The Gordin Cell, modified to depict North/South Korean relations. In 2017, Kim was cast in KBS2's time-slip drama Manhole, as a man who travels back and forth through time to stop a wedding from taking place.

For the first time in 10 years, Kim returned to entertainment shows in South Korea with his appearance as a panelist for season 2 of Taste of Love in 2019. In 2020, Kim hosted a travel series where he ventured to Argentina alone to befriend strangers for Lifetime Korea's Travel Buddies which aired 10 episodes from February 8, 2020, to April 2, 2020. During a press conference, Kim stated, "We all shared similar worries. We mostly talked about the ways to unfold our life and attain goals. I believe many viewers would empathize with us. Through the conversations, I reflected upon my bygone days and deeply thought about my future. Thus, the trip was not merely about playing and entertaining to me". Kim is filming season 2 of Travel Buddies which will take place in South Korea. The airing is scheduled from the end of April to the beginning of May 2021. On March 29, 2021, Kim debuted his 6-episode variety show called ジェジュンＪ! (Jaejoong J!) which was broadcast in Japan on channel BS SKY PerfecTV.

In the summer of 2021, Kim will have a documentary released about his life and career called Jaejoong: On the Road, directed by John H. Lee. In 2022, Kim was cast as the lead male role in the Korean television drama Bad Memory Eraser co-starring Jin Se-yeon. He guest starred in the third episode of the television adaptation of the manga Waru - Who said it's not cool to work?, for which he also sang the theme song.

Directing career
Kim served as executive director for the Asian leg of JYJ's 2011 Worldwide Tour.  He also participated in the directing team for the 2011 LG Whisen Rhythmic All Stars.

Personal life

Kim helped launch Moldir, a Korean fashion brand that opened in September 2013. C-JeS Entertainment, his management, noted that Kim "has his own distinctive fashion and artistic sense. He will take it to a more serious level with his new role as an art director". He owned the largest number of shares in the company and served as the art director until it "closed for restructuring" due to COVID-19 issues in March 2020. Kim is also known for his cooking ability and has released two cookbooks, Romantic Recipes volume 1 and volume 2. The first volume was released on July 25, 2018, and featured French cuisine and was written in Japanese. The second volume was released on August 7, 2019, featuring Korean dishes and was published in Korean and Japanese. He credits his mother, who owned a restaurant, with inspiring him to become skilled at cooking.

Kim enlisted in the army on March 31, 2015, the first five weeks spent for his mandatory basic training at the 1st Infantry Division (Republic of Korea) recruit training center in Gwangtan-myeon, Paju, Gyeonggi province. He later ended up as the top recruit among the 244 in his batch, earning the Excellence Award during the graduation ceremony. He was under the 55th Infantry Division in Cheoin-gu, Yongin to serve as an active-duty soldier for 21 months and was also a member of the military band. He was discharged on December 30, 2016.

On April 1, 2020 during the COVID-19 pandemic in South Korea, Kim posted on his Instagram account claiming that he has tested positive for COVID-19 due to him "[living] carelessly, disregarding all of the cautions provided by the government." An hour later, Kim posted an apology on his Instagram that the diagnosis was not true, which drew outrage from fans. He further explained his reasoning for the initial post was to raise awareness of the dangers of the virus, noting he personally knows individuals who have been infected and his father recently underwent lung cancer surgery.

Discography

Studio albums

Extended plays

Singles

Music videos

Soundtracks

Composing and songwriting

Filmography

Film

Television series

Variety shows

Tours

Awards and nominations

References

External links

 Official Japanese site
 
 

JYJ members
1986 births
Japanese-language singers of South Korea
South Korean male idols
South Korean pop singers
South Korean male singers
South Korean male film actors
Living people
People from Gongju
South Korean male television actors
SM Entertainment artists
TVXQ members
Kyung Hee Cyber University alumni
Shorty Award winners